The 2013 UMass Minutemen football team represented the University of Massachusetts Amherst in the 2013 NCAA Division I FBS football season as a member of the East Division of the Mid-American Conference. The team was coached by Charley Molnar in his second year and played its home games at Gillette Stadium in Foxborough, Massachusetts.

The 2013 season marked the team's second season as a member of the MAC, and also marked the first season in which the Minutemen were eligible for the conference championship as well as post-season bowl play. For the second straight year the Minutemen finished the season with an overall record of 1–11 with a Conference record of 1–7 which placed them in 6th place in the MAC East Division. At the end of the season Tackle Anthony Dima, a senior, was honored as an All-MAC Third Team selection. Molnar was later fired on December 26 after a second consecutive 1-11 season. He was replaced by Mark Whipple.

Recruits

Schedule

Transfers In

 Note: Miller, Anderson and Osei were immediately eligible to play the 2013 season without sitting out one season per NCAA eligibility rules. All three athletes achieved their undergraduate degrees and still had one season of eligibility left. They are all enrolled as graduate students in the UMass Graduate School of Education.

Game summaries

@ Wisconsin

Maine

@ Kansas State

Vanderbilt

@ Bowling Green

Miami (OH)

@ Buffalo

Western Michigan

Northern Illinois

Akron

@ Central Michigan

@ Ohio

Team players selected in the 2014 NFL Draft

References

UMass
UMass Minutemen football seasons
UMass Minutemen football